Armature Studio, LLC is an American video game development studio in Austin, Texas. The studio, founded by former Retro Studios directors Mark Pacini and Todd Keller in September 2008, developed Batman: Arkham Origins Blackgate (2013) and ReCore (2016).

History 
In April 2008, after completing Metroid Prime 3: Corruption in 2007 for Nintendo, former game director Mark Pacini, art director Todd Keller, and principal technology engineer Jack Mathews left Retro Studios to start Armature, which was founded in September 2008. Armature's first game was porting Metal Gear Solid HD Collection to the PlayStation Vita in 2012. In April 2013, Warner Bros. Interactive Entertainment announced that Batman: Arkham Origins Blackgate would be developed by Armature as their first new work and released for both the PlayStation Vita and the Nintendo 3DS on October 25, 2013. The third game developed was the PlayStation Vita edition of Injustice: Gods Among Us.

The studio was originally responsible to handle porting Bloodstained: Ritual of the Night to the PlayStation Vita and Wii U. This included porting Unreal Engine 4 to both platforms, as they are not supported by the engine officially. Armature was going to make their engine code available to licensed PS Vita and Wii U developers after Bloodstained finished. However, the game has since been cancelled on both platforms for various reasons as the game's development extended to 2019.

In October 2015, the studio announced its first original intellectual property, Dead Star, a space-themed multiplayer online multidirectional shooter. It was released on April 5, 2016, for Microsoft Windows and PlayStation 4, but online functionality was disabled on November 1, 2016, and the game is no longer available for purchase.

Armature has since collaborated with Epic Games in providing development support for Fortnite, and made three games for virtual reality headsets, with Fail Factory for the Gear VR, Sports Scramble for the Oculus Quest., and Resident Evil 4 VR for the Oculus Quest 2.

In October 2022, Armature was acquired by Meta Platforms.

Games developed

References

External links 
 

Companies based in Austin, Texas
Video game companies established in 2008
Privately held companies based in Texas
Video game companies based in Texas
Video game development companies
2008 establishments in Texas
2022 mergers and acquisitions
Meta Platforms acquisitions